Pandanus papenooensis is a species of plant in the family Pandanaceae. It is endemic to French Polynesia.

References

Flora of French Polynesia
papenooensis
Near threatened plants
Taxonomy articles created by Polbot